The Royal Black Institution, the Imperial Grand Black Chapter Of The British Commonwealth, or simply the Black Institution, is a Protestant fraternal society though some scholars[who?] argue is an Ulster  syncretism of ritualistic Freemasonry.

History
The Royal Black Institution was formed in Ireland in 1797, two years after the formation of the Orange Order in Daniel Winter's cottage, Loughgall, County Armagh, Ireland.

The society is formed from Orangemen and can be seen as a progression of that Order although they are separate institutions. Anyone wishing to be admitted to the Royal Black Institution must first become a member of an Orange Order Lodge, and many are members of both.

The Royal Black is often referred to as "the senior of the loyal orders".

Members wear a sash or collarette of which the predominant colour is black.

Organisation and events

Its headquarters are in Loughgall, County Armagh. Members refer to each other as "Sir Knight", whereas in the Orange Order members are referred to as "Brother" or "Brethren". The RBI claim that their basis is the promotion of scripture and the principles of the Protestant Reformation. However, this is contested by people who suggest that the rituals are not biblical. It has preceptories throughout the world, mainly in the major English-speaking countries, and is particularly strong in Newfoundland.

In 1931, on the day before a planned demonstration by members of the Royal Black Institution, crossing the border from Northern Ireland and into the then Irish Free State, the IRA occupied Cootehill in County Cavan, as a counter protest.

In Northern Ireland it holds an annual parade in the village of Scarva, County Down, on 13 July (the day after the Orange Order's 12 July celebrations). It is commonly referred to as "The Sham Fight" as it involves a mock fight between actors reenacting the Battle of the Boyne. The other major parade of the year is "Black Saturday", also known as "Last Saturday", held on the last Saturday in August at several locations throughout Ulster (including a major parade in Raphoe in the Laggan district of East Donegal, Ireland).

The society is also popular in Scotland, where 60 preceptories exist organised into 11 districts across the country. Twenty-six marches by the Black Institution have taken place in Glasgow alone between 2009 and 2010.

2012 apology
The Royal Black Institution has adopted a more conciliatory attitude to contentious parades than the Orange Order, and is less overtly political, though not without political influence.

After loyalist bands defied a Parades Commission ruling on Black Saturday by playing music outside St Patrick's Catholic Church on Donegall Street, Belfast, the Royal Black Institution issued an apology to the clergy and parishioners of the church for any offence caused. 
The parish priest, Father Michael Sheehan, welcomed the apology and "the sincere Christian spirit behind it".

Degrees

The society's members are assigned one of eleven degrees, as follows, in descending order:

 Royal Black Degree
 Royal Scarlet Degree
 Royal Mark Degree
 Apron and Royal Blue Degree
 Royal White Degree
 Royal Green Degree
 Gold Degree
 Star and Garter Degree
 Crimson Arrow Degree
 Link and Chain Degree
 Red Cross Degree

The Institution also possesses a final retrospective overview degree, which is essentially an overview of the eleven.

Sovereign Grand Masters
A chronological list of Sovereign Grand Masters of the Royal Black Preceptory:
 1846: Thomas Irwin
 1849: Morris Knox
 1850: Thomas Johnston
 1857: William Johnston
 1902: H. W. Chambers
 1914: William Henry Holmes Lyons
 1924: Sir William James Allen
 1948: Sir Norman Stronge, 8th Baronet
 1971: Jim Molyneaux
 1995: William J Logan 
 2008: Millar Farr
 2018: William Anderson

See also
Orange Order

Notes and references

External links
 Royal Black Institution official website

1797 establishments in Ireland
Irish culture
Irish secret societies
Orange Order
Religious service organizations
Unionism in Ireland